Sir Christopher Frederick Ashton Warner, GBE, KCMG (17 January 1895 – 13 January 1957) was a British diplomat. He was British Ambassador to Belgium from 1951 to 1955.

Warmer was appointed CMG in 1943, KCMG in 1951, and GBE in 1956.

References 

Ambassadors of the United Kingdom to Belgium
1957 deaths
Members of HM Diplomatic Service
Knights Grand Cross of the Order of the British Empire
Knights Commander of the Order of St Michael and St George
1895 births
People educated at Winchester College
Alumni of Magdalen College, Oxford
Royal Fusiliers officers
British Army personnel of World War I
20th-century British diplomats